Georgetown Chimes is an all-male collegiate a cappella group from Georgetown University in Washington, D.C.. Founded in 1946 by Francis E. (Frank) Jones as a barbershop quartet, the group has had over 275 members, and has recorded two dozen albums in its history. The Chimes are particularly well known for the annual a capella show they host each fall, nicknamed "the Cherry Tree Massacre" which has been hosted for over 50 years. Within Washington, D.C., the Chimes are known for hosting regular "Chimes Nights" at the Tombs, a popular rathskeller bar in the Georgetown neighborhood. Additionally, the Chimes are regularly featured as guests in the DC A Cappella Festival (DCAF). The Chimes' alumni includes politicians and public figures such as U.S. Senator from Georgia Jon Ossoff and Jeff Civillico.

References

External links
Georgetown Chimes Official website
Georgetown Chimes Music on Spotify

American vocal groups
Collegiate a cappella groups
Student organizations established in 1946
1946 establishments in Washington, D.C.
Georgetown University student organizations
Musical groups from Washington, D.C.
Musical groups established in 1946